A food cooperative or food co-op is a food distribution outlet organized as a cooperative, rather than a private or public company. Food cooperatives are usually consumer cooperatives, where the decisions regarding the production and distribution of its food are chosen by its members. Like all cooperatives, food cooperatives are often based on the 7 Rochdale Principles, and they typically offer natural foods. Since decisions about how to run a cooperative are not made by outside shareholders, cooperatives often exhibit a higher degree of social responsibility than their corporate analogues.

In the United States, the National Cooperative Grocers (NCG) is a cooperative federation that is composed of 146 food cooperatives.

History
The cooperative movement started in the 19th century and the first notable food cooperative was started in Rochdale, England by industrial weavers known as the Rochdale Pioneers. The origination of the modern cooperative movement began in the 1960s when many "second wave" cooperatives started. The goals of these cooperatives were to provide an organic and anti-corporate alternative to chain grocery stores. Food cooperatives began to emerge in major cities and college towns, catering to the food-conscious. Co-op members made the decision of what foods to buy and how to purchase and distribute it.

Between 1969 and 1979, close to 10,000 food co-ops were established.

Economic structure 
A key aspect of the food cooperative model is the socialization of potential profit associated with running a grocery store. In a typical food production model, a store is owned by a company, which is in turn managed by either a board of directors and shareholders if the company is publicly owned, or a collection of private individuals if it is not. A food cooperative, in contrast, is directly owned by both its employees and its members, people who shop at the cooperative and who typically pay a nominal fee for joining. When the store makes a profit, much as with a corporation, these profits are either divided among the members or reinvested in the business. These decisions are often made by a board, for which any member of the cooperative can run. In general, membership is open to any community member, with stores adopting official policies of nondiscrimination. However, some cooperatives will limit membership to a certain geographic area, such as a state.

Pricing 
Each cooperative has a different fee structure, typically determined by its management, but in general, members of the public will have the option of purchasing a membership that will yield discounted prices on food, as well as a vote on decisions. A key difference with corporations is that while voting power on corporate decisions is in proportion to the number of shares owned, nearly all cooperatives operate according to the “one member, one vote” principle.

Tax policy 
In the US, cooperatives are taxed differently than small businesses. Earnings of the cooperative itself are not subject to business taxes; however, any profits made by the individual members are treated as income and as such are subject to income taxes.

Comparison with CSA 
In contrast, a similar program, community supported agriculture, socializes the risks associated with growing the food, transferring it from the growers to consumers. These two programs often work in concert in rural areas, and are associated with each other by consumers. However, in a CSA program, the consumer is purchasing a limited ownership in the farm, the production of the food, instead of the grocery store, the distribution of the food.

Scale of cooperatives in the United States
Food cooperatives in various forms operate on a large scale in the United States, occupying a noticeable part of the grocery market, albeit with large geographic variation. One study found that grocery cooperatives claim 485,000 total members in the United States, with 325 total stores. However, differences in definition can lead to measurement discrepancies, depending on what exactly one defines as a food based cooperative, since many cooperatives operate in the food sector, but are not restricted to groceries. For example, “Farm supply and marketing” cooperative members totaled 2.484 million in the US.

Formation of a food cooperative 
In general, cooperatives are formed by a core group of members who form the initial governing body. These members must contribute enough in initial membership fees to get the grocery store off the ground and finance startup costs, such as purchasing a store, which can be a significant challenge for the cooperative model. The logistical and financial obstacles associated with planning a store and establishing a distribution network are significant, especially when no individual owns the store. This contrasts with typical corporate grocery stores, which can be financed using debt or equity, and whose owners can eventually reap a profit to recoup their investment. Nevertheless, cooperatives claim higher levels of success than for-profit businesses: after 5 years, 90% of cooperatives are still in business, compared to 3-5% of businesses.

Benefits

Market benefits 
Cooperatives have potential spillover effects on the rest of the grocery store market. According to researchers at the University of Wisconsin, “Cooperatives play a key role in agricultural markets not only because they account for a significant fraction of economic activity in this sector, but also because they are believed to generate a pro-competitive effect in imperfectly competitive markets.” The grocery market, in particular, is often not very competitive in geographically isolated areas, with only enough consumer base to support one major supermarket. In response to high prices caused by this monopoly, a cooperative may spring up, supported by a network of consumers looking for lower prices. Because the profits are redistributed to the members, a traditional grocery store must reduce its profits in order to compete. Lastly, some studies indicate the spillover benefits to the community are significant. One found that “For every $1,000 spent at a food co-op, $1,606 goes to the local economy; for every $1 million in sales, 9.3 jobs are created”.

Agricultural sector benefits 
Academic research has also described the benefits cooperatives can have in economically connected sectors, namely food production: “Cooperatives play other socially beneficial roles in the agricultural sector. They provide an opportunity for farmers to share risk and to control managerial decision-making for their direct benefit. Additionally, they offer a credence attribute — farmer ownership — which can be attached to farm commodities, thus providing additional value to some consumers.”

Consumer benefits 
Another potential benefit to members is the different niche of the food market often occupied by cooperatives. Cooperatives often have a focus on local, organic, or otherwise more sustainably sourced products. Consumers often support the local ownership of the cooperative model, in contrast to many grocery store chains owned by multinational corporations.

Geography 
In the United States, food cooperatives are also far more common in the northern states of the US, with Vermont, Minnesota, and Wisconsin having the highest concentrations. Vermont, in particular, has a concentration three times higher than any other state. Food cooperatives are also co-located with higher incomes, higher educational attainment, the presence of land trusts, and population over age 65. In the United States, there are a number of regional associations of food cooperatives. These associations can provide logistical support, a distribution network, or operate under the franchise model, which can provide a recognizable brand.

See also

 Cooperative
 Consumers' cooperative
 Community-supported agriculture
 Food conspiracy
 List of food cooperatives
 Minnesota Food Cooperative Wars
 Vegetable box scheme

Footnotes

Further reading
 Anne Meis Knupfer, Food Co-ops in America: Communities, Consumption, and Economic Democracy. Ithaca, NY: Cornell University Press, 2013.

 
Private aid programs